Portugal has the 5th largest exclusive economic zone (EEZ) within Europe, 3rd largest of the EU and the 20th largest EEZ in the world, at 1,727,408 km2.

Portugal's exclusive economic zone 

 Continental Portugal 327,667 km2
 Madeira Islands 446,108 km2
 Azores Islands 953,633 km2
 Total: 1,727,408 km2

Portugal submitted a claim to extend its jurisdiction over additional 2.15 million square kilometers of the neighboring continental shelf in May 2009, which would result in a marine territory of more than 3,877,408 km2.

Resolved Dispute with Spain 

Until 2009, Spain disputed the EEZ's southern border, maintaining that it should be drawn halfway between Madeira and the Canary Islands. Portugal exercises sovereignty over the Savage Islands, a small archipelago north of the Canaries, hence claiming an EEZ border further south. Spain had objected by arguing that the Savage Islands do not have a separate continental shelf, citing article 121 of the United Nations Convention on the Law of the Sea. On the basis of this article, Spain claimed that the Savage Islands were not islands, but instead uninhabitable rocks. The Savage Islands are a protected Portuguese natural reserve, and thus its only year-round inhabitants are workers of Madeira Natural Park who look over the isolated natural reserve, protecting its wildlife. Over the years, the Portuguese authorities have seized some Spanish fishing boats around the area for illegal fishing.

See also 

 Continental shelf
 Fishing in Portugal
 International waters
 Territorial waters

References

External links 

  United Nations Convention on the Law of the Sea – Part V
 Sea Around Us Project – View the EEZ of all nations (Note that this site does not distinguish between territorial waters and the EEZ, and so tends to overstate EEZ areas.)
 Task Group for the extension of the Continental Shelf map
 GIS data at VLIZ Maritime Boundaries Geodatabase

Economy of Portugal
Portugal
Borders of Portugal
Fishing in Portugal